The Qutub Shahi Tombs are located in the Ibrahim Bagh (garden precinct), close to the famous Golconda Fort in Hyderabad, India. They contain the tombs and mosques built by the various kings of the Qutub Shahi dynasty. The galleries of the smaller tombs are of a single storey while the larger ones are two storied. In the centre of each tomb is a sarcophagus which overlies the actual burial vault in a crypt below. The domes were originally overlaid with blue and green tiles, of which only a few pieces now remain.

The complex was put by UNESCO on its "tentative list" to become a World Heritage Site in 2014, with others in the region, under the name Monuments and Forts of the Deccan Sultanate (despite there being a number of different sultanates).

Seven Qutub Shahi Tombs 
Sultan Quli Qutb-ul-Mulk         

Jamsheed Quli Qutb Shah      srival
Ibrahim Quli Qutub Shah Wali  (1550-1580)

Muhammad Quli Qutb Shah     (1580-1612)

Sultan Muhammad Qutb Shah  (1612-1626)

Abdullah Qutb Shah                  (1626-1672)

Hayat Bakshi Begum                 (Died: 1667) She was the only daughter of Muhammad Quli Qutb Shah.

Location

The tomb complex lies north of the outer perimeter wall of Golkonda Fort and its Banjara Darwaza (Gate of the Gypsies), amidst the Ibrahim bagh.

Description
The tombs form a large cluster and stand on a raised platform. They are domed structures built on a square base surrounded by pointed arches, a distinctive style that blends Persian and Indian forms. The tombs are structures with intricately carved stonework and are surrounded by landscaped gardens.

The tombs were once furnished with carpets, chandeliers and velvet canopies on silver poles. Copies of the Quran were kept on pedestals and readers recited verses from the holy book at regular intervals. Golden spires were fitted over the tombs of the sultans to distinguish their tombs from those of other members of the royal families.

History
During the Qutb Shahi period, these tombs were held in great veneration. But after their reign, the tombs were neglected until Sir Salar Jung III ordered their restoration in the early 19th century. A garden was laid out, and a compound wall was built. Once again, the tomb-garden of the Qutb Shahi family became a place of serene beauty. All except the last of the Qutb Shahi sultans lie buried here.

Sultan Quli Qutb Mulk's tomb, the style of which sets the example for the tombs of his descendants, is on an elevated terrace measuring 30 meters in each direction. The tomb chamber proper is octagonal, with each side measuring around 10 meters. The entire structure is crowned by a circular dome. There are three graves in this tomb chamber and twenty-one laid out on the surrounding terrace, all of which lack inscription except for the main tomb. The inscription on Sultan Quli's tomb is in three bands, in the Naskh and Tauq scripts. The inscription refers to Sultan Quli as Bade Malik (Great Master) — the endearing term by which all people of the Deccan used for him. The tomb was built in 1543 A.D. by the Sultan, during his lifetime, as was the custom.

Near the tomb of Sultan Quli is that of his son, Jamsheed, the second in the line of Qutb Shahi sultans. Built in 1550 A.D., this is the only Qutb Shahi tomb which has not been fashioned from shining black basalt. Its appearance, too, is quite unlike the other tombs in the garden — it rises gracefully in two stories, unlike the squat tombs of the other kings. Jamsheed Quli Qutb Shah's is the only tomb of a Qutb Shahi ruler without any inscriptions; of course, Jamsheed's son, Subhan's tomb also does not have any inscriptions. Subhan Quli Qutb Shah ruled for a short time. Subhan's tomb stands midway between the tombs of his father and grandfather. He was popularly called Chhote Malik (Small Master).

Sultan Ibrahim Quli Qutb Shah's tomb, built in 1580, after his death, is slightly larger than Sultan Quli's tomb. Traces of the enameled tiles, which once adorned this mausoleum, can still be seen on the southern wall. The tomb has two graves in the main chamber and 16 on the terrace; some of them probably are those of his six sons and three daughters. There are inscriptions in the Thuluth script on all faces of the sarcophagus. The three famous calligraphists — Isphalan, Ismail and Taqiuddin Muhammad Salih — who left a store of Naskh, Thuluth and Nastaliq inscriptions on the many Qutb Shahi edifices in the city, were contemporaries of Ibrahim Shah.

Sultan Muhammed Quli Qutb Shah's mausoleum is considered the grandest of the Qutb Shahi tombs. Built in 1602 A.D., the tomb is on a terrace of 65m square and 4m high. A flight of steps leads to the mausoleum proper, which is 22 m square on the outside and 11 m square on the inside. There are entrances on the southern and eastern sides. The tomb is in a vault below the terrace. Inscriptions in Persian and the Naskh scripts decorate it.

Another grand mausoleum is that of the sixth sultan, Muhammed Qutb Shah. The facade of this tomb was once decorated with enameled tiles; only traces are now evident. There are six graves and inscriptions in Thuluth and Naskh. The mausoleum was built in 1626. Sultan Abdullah Qutb Shah's tomb is the last of the royal tombs, as Abul Hasan Qutb Shah (Tana Shah), the last Qutb Shahi Sultan, was a prisoner in the fortress of Daulatabad, near Aurangabad, when he died. While the tombs of those who ruled dominate the area, interspersed are many other monuments, most of them tombs of other members of the royal family.

The tomb of Fatima Sultan, with its bulbous dome, is near the entrance to the tomb-garden. Fatima was the sister of Muhammed Qutb Shah. Her tomb houses several graves, two with inscriptions. Immediately to the south of Muhammed Quli's tomb are three uninscribed tombs. There are the mausoleums of Kulthoom, Muhammed Qutb Shahi's granddaughter born of the son of the sultan's favourite wife Khurshid Bibi, her (Kulthoom's) husband and daughter. Kulthoom's tomb is on the west of this cluster.

The twin-tombs of the two favourite hakims (physicians) of Sultan Abdullah — Nizamuddin Ahmed Gilani and Abdul Jabbar Gilani — were built in 1651. They are among the few Qutb Shahi tombs that are not of royalty. Another pair are those of Premamati and Taramati, the favourite courtesans of Sultan Abdullah Shah, were laid to rest beside his tomb. One other tomb which is not that of a Qutb Shahi family member is that of Neknam Khan. Neknam Khan, who served in Abdullah's army, was the commander-in-chief of the Carnatic. His tomb is on a platform outside the mausoleum of Ibrahim Qutb Shah. It was built in 1672, two years after Nekam Khan's death.

The last sultan of the dynasty, Abul Hasan Qutb Shah (also known as Tana Shah), was not buried alongside his ancestor. Instead, he was buried at Khuldabad. The mausoleum which Abul Hasan, the last Qutb Shahi Sultan, began building for himself, actually houses the grave of Mir Ahmed, the son of Sultan Abdullah's son-in-law and the sister of Abbas II Safair, the Shah of Persia. The tomb of Fadma Khanum, one of Sultan Abdullah's daughters, stands near the mausoleum of her husband, Mir Ahmed. Hers is the only Qutb Shahi tomb not surmounted by a dome.

To the west of the tombs lies the dargah of Hussain Shah Wali, the revered Sufi saint. He is most affectionately remembered by people as the builder of Hussain Sagar in 1562. Among other monuments in the garden that are not tombs, the most important are the mortuary bath and the Masjid of Hayat Bakshi Begum.

The mortuary bath, which stands opposite the tomb of Muhammad Quli, was built by Sultan Quli to facilitate the ritual washing of the bodies of the dead kings and others of the royal family before they were carried to their final resting place. The practice followed was to bring the body out of the fort, through the Banjara Gate, to this bath, before carrying it away for burial with the ritualistic pomp that was required to mark the occasion. A large number of people — relatives, officials, friends, and fond subjects — attended. The bath is one of the finest existing specimens of ancient Persian or Turkish baths.

The Qutb Shahis built a number of masjids all over Golkonda and Hyderabad, and almost every tomb has a masjid adjacent. The biggest and the grandest such masjid is by the mausoleum of Hayat Bakshi Begum. Popularly known as the great masjid of the Golkonda tombs, it was built in 1666 A.D. Fifteen cupolas decorate the roof and the prayer-hall is flanked by two lofty minarets. The impression, as a whole, is one of majesty and splendour. The inscriptions in the masjid are in calligraphic art.

Hayat Bakshi Begum was the daughter of Muhammed Quli Qutb Shah, the fifth sultan, the wife of Sultan Muhammed Qutb Shah, the sixth sultan and the mother of Abdullah Qutb Shah, the seventh sultan. She was affectionately known as "Ma Saheba" (Revered Mother). The tomb-garden of the sultans of Golkonda was known as "Lagar-e-Faiz Athar" (a place for bountiful entertainment) in the days of the Qutb Shahi rulers, for some item or song or dance or even an occasional play was staged here every evening, free of cost, to entertain the poor.

Restoration 
The Telangana State Archaeology and Museums Department, in collaboration with the Aga Khan Trust for Culture, has restored the tombs. The restoration of the stepwells within the complex was funded by the US Ambassadors Fund for Cultural Preservation. The restoration work started in 2013, and was unveiled by the U.S. Ambassador to India on 10 March 2020. While restoration work paused due to the Covid-19 pandemic, work has now continued at a slower rate.

In Art and Literature
An engraving of a painting by William Purser entitled  is the subject of a poetical illustration  by Letitia Elizabeth Landon in Fisher's Drawing Room Scrap Book, 1838.

Gallery

See also
 Golkonda
 Hyderabad, Telangana
 Charminar
 Makkah Masjid, Hyderabad
 Purani Haveli
 Taramati Baradari

References

Citations

Bibliography

External links

Image gallery of Qutb Shahi Tombs
Picture
Photographs of Qutb Shahi Tombs
Qutb Shahi Tombs pictures and spherical panoramas 360°

Monuments and memorials in Hyderabad, India
Mausoleums in Telangana
1543 establishments in Asia
Tombs in India
World Heritage Tentative List for India